The 2011 ATP Studena Croatia Open was a men's tennis tournament played on outdoor clay courts. It was the 22nd edition of the ATP Studena Croatia Open, and was part of the ATP World Tour 250 Series of the 2011 ATP World Tour. It took place at the International Tennis Center in Umag, Croatia, from 26 July through 31 July 2011.

ATP entrants

Seeds

*Seedings based on the 18 July 2011 rankings.

Other entrants
The following players received wildcards into the singles main draw:
  Mate Delić
  Mate Pavić
  Antonio Veić

The following players received entry from the qualifying draw:

  Dušan Lajović
  Gianluca Naso
  Rubén Ramírez Hidalgo
  Simone Vagnozzi

Finals

Singles

 Alexandr Dolgopolov defeated  Marin Čilić, 6–4, 3–6, 6–3
 It was Dolgopolov's 1st career title.

Doubles

 Simone Bolelli /  Fabio Fognini defeated  Marin Čilić /  Lovro Zovko, 6–3, 5–7, [10–7]

References

External links
 Official website

ATP Studena Croatia Open
2011
2011 in Croatian tennis